La Guadeloupe is a village in the Beauce-Sartigan Regional County Municipality in the Chaudière-Appalaches region of Quebec, Canada. Its population is 1,805 as of 2022.

Demographics 

Population
Population trend:

Language
Mother tongue language (2021)

References

External links

Villages in Quebec
Incorporated places in Chaudière-Appalaches